Jean-Pierre Klein (born 24 January 1944 in Heisdorf) is a Luxembourgish politician for the Luxembourg Socialist Workers' Party (LSAP) and jurist.  He has been a member of the Chamber of Deputies for the Centre constituency since the 1994 election.  He is also the mayor of Steinsel: a position that he has held since 1 January 1988.

Klein was not elected at the 2004 election, falling just short (in 5th place on the LSAP list, which won 4 seats in Centre).  However, Robert Goebbels, who had placed third, resigned his office before the new Chamber was sworn in, allowing the next-placed Klein to take his place.

Footnotes

External links
  Official Chamber of Deputies biography

Mayors of places in Luxembourg
Members of the Chamber of Deputies (Luxembourg)
Members of the Chamber of Deputies (Luxembourg) from Centre
Councillors in Steinsel
Luxembourg Socialist Workers' Party politicians
Luxembourgian jurists
1944 births
Living people
People from Steinsel